The Four Continents, also known as The Four Rivers of Paradise, is a painting by Flemish artist Peter Paul Rubens, made in the 1610s. It depicts the female personifications of what, at the time, were believed to be four continents (Europe, Asia, Africa and America) sitting with the personifications of their respective major rivers – the Danube, the Ganges, the Nile and the Río de la Plata. Europe is shown on the left, Africa in the middle, Asia on the right and America behind it, to the left. The tigress, protecting the cubs from the crocodile, is used as a symbol of Asia. The personification of the Danube holds a rudder. The bottom part of the painting shows several putti. Painted during a period of truce between the Dutch Republic and Spain, the river allegories and their female companions in  a lush, bountiful setting reflect the conditions that Rubens hoped would return to Antwerp after military hostilities.

The art historian Elizabeth McGrath proposed a different interpretation of the female figures on the painting, believing them to be water nymphs representing the sources of the rivers instead. McGrath also suggested corresponding river names, the Tigris instead of the Danube and the Euphrates instead of the Río de la Plata, arguing that those names also appear as the rivers of Paradise in Christian exegesis.

References

External links
Kunsthistorisches Museum entry

Paintings by Peter Paul Rubens
17th-century allegorical paintings
Allegorical paintings by Flemish artists
Nude art
1610s paintings
Paintings in the collection of the Kunsthistorisches Museum
Animals in art
Tigers in art
Continents in art